Turone (c. 1390) was an Italian architect, painter and illuminator, active in the Veronese area in the second half of the 14th century.

Life
Little is known about Turone da Verona's early life. His exact date of birth is unknown. He was born in Milan or Verona, the information on his human and artistic life is very limited and all in the Veronese area. A document dated 1356 mentions it as "Turonem quondam domini Maxii de Camenago diocexis Mediolanensis et nunc habitantem Verone", indicating its Lombard origin and its recent move to the city; he is then registered as a witness in an act of 1360 relating to the convent of Santa Maria della Scala, and in another of 1387 no longer available, while from 1393 he is already dead.

In Turone's painting we can see an example of a Venetian-Padan reworking of the Giotto lesson, which in Veneto above allbut only marginally in Venicehad a strong impact thanks to the extraordinary works of the Tuscan Master (the Scrovegni Chapel and those lost in the Basilica del Santo and the Palazzo della Ragione). A reworking that adds greater excitement and dramatization of the actions and a more decisive use of color to Giotto's perspective and volume. It was Altichiero da Zevio, probably Turone's pupil, who reached the apex of this pictorial approach.

Among the most significant works attributed to Turone is the fresco of a crucifixion on the counter-façade of the church of San Fermo Maggiore in Verona. Another site where Turone's work can be observed is the church of Santa Anastasia, in Verona. The rare works on wood that have come down to us attributable to Turone are found in the Veronese museum of Castelvecchio. Of Turone must also be mentioned the activity of miniaturist who once again in Verona has its greatest legacies. He is known to have been active in 1387. One work attributed to him is dated from 1360.

Works
 Holy Trinity among Saints Zeno, John the Baptist, Peter and Paul (1360), polyptych, Castelvecchio Museum, Verona
 Crucifixion, counter-façade of the Church of San Fermo Maggiore, Verona
 The last judgement San Anastasia Church, Verona
 Verona Museums

Notes

References

Bibliography

Further reading

External links

 

14th-century Italian painters
Italian male painters
Painters from Verona
Manuscript illuminators